The girls' singles of the tournament 2022 BWF World Junior Championships is an individual badminton tournament to crowned the best girls' singles under 19 player across the BWF associate members around the world. Players will compete to win the Eye Level Cup presented by the former BWF President and chairman of the World Youth Culture Foundation, Kang Young Joong. The tournament will be held from 24 to 30 October 2022 in the Palacio de Deportes de Santander, Spain. The defending champion was Riko Gunji from Japan, but she was not eligible to participate this year.

Seeds 

  Anupama Upadhyaya (third round)
  Sirada Roongpiboonsopit (fourth round)
  Ester Nurumi Tri Wardoyo (semi-finals)
  Polina Buhrova (third round)
  Unnati Hooda (fourth round)
  Lucía Rodríguez (second round)
  Tasya Farahnailah (fourth round)
  Lisa Curtin (second round)

  Pitchamon Opatniputh (quarter-finals)
  Émilie Drouin (second round)
  Lucie Amiguet (third round)
  Kaloyana Nalbantova (second round)
  Sophia Noble (third round)
  Petra Maixnerová (first round)
  Benedicte Sillassen (first round)
  Lucie Krulová (second round)

Draw

Finals

Top half

Section 1

Section 2

Section 3

Section 4

Bottom half

Section 5

Section 6

Section 7

Section 8

References

External link 
Draw

2022 BWF World Junior Championships